Fiona O'Carroll is an Irish actress and a cast-member of the popular BBC/RTÉ sitcom, Mrs. Brown's Boys. Fiona is the daughter of Doreen O'Carroll and Mrs. Brown's Boys star and creator, Brendan O'Carroll.

Early life and family
O'Carroll was born in Dublin in Ireland, her younger brothers are Danny and Eric.

O'Carroll's stepmother is the Irish actress Jennifer Gibney, the wife of her father Brendan O'Carroll.

Career
O'Carroll has been a cast member of Mrs. Brown's Boys portraying Maria Brown since its inception. She reprised her role in the 2014 film, Mrs. Brown's Boys D'Movie and the 2017 chat show All Round to Mrs. Brown's.

In 2014, O'Carroll was also in the ITV drama The Widower.

Personal life
O'Carroll married her Mrs. Brown's Boys co-star, Martin Delany, who is originally from Australia, on 18 May 2006. They have four sons together; 14-year-old Felix, 12-year-old Isaac, 8-year-old Eli and 6-year-old Dexter, as of 2022. Three of her sons are autistic. In December 2021, she announced her split from Delany.

Delany now lives in Portugal following his divorce with O'Carroll and they were reunited during the Christmas of 2021.

O'Carroll has two nephews, Jamie and Blake, her brother Danny is the father of her two nephews.

In August 2017, O'Carroll completed a 260-mile walk from Cork to Belfast in aid of Billy's World, a charity for children with special needs.

Her aunt Fiona O'Carroll, a sister of her father Brendan, died in 2020 in Canada.

References

External links

Living people
21st-century Irish actresses
Actresses from Dublin (city)
Irish television actresses
Year of birth missing (living people)